Lapparentemys is an extinct genus of podocnemidid turtles. Fossils of the genus have been found in the Tiupampan Santa Lucía Formation of Bolivia. The type species is L. vilavilensis.

References

Further reading 
 

Podocnemididae
Prehistoric turtle genera
Paleocene reptiles of South America
Tiupampan
Paleogene Bolivia
Fossils of Bolivia
Santa Lucía Formation
Fossil taxa described in 2011
Extinct turtles
Danian genera